Paul Wolf (21 November 1879 – 30 April 1957) was a German architect. His work was part of the architecture event in the art competition at the 1928 Summer Olympics.

References

1879 births
1957 deaths
20th-century German architects
Olympic competitors in art competitions
People from Schwäbisch Hall (district)